F road may refer to:
 F roads in Cyprus are local roads
 F roads in Iceland are tracks that require a four-wheel-drive vehicle
 F road in the USA may refer to :
 County-designated highways in zone F in Michigan
 Corridor F, a highway in the U.S. states of Tennessee and Kentucky
 F roads in Zimbabwe are freeways